Holiday Night is the sixth Korean studio album and ninth overall by South Korean girl group Girls' Generation. It was released digitally on August 4 and physically on August 7, 2017, by SM Entertainment to commemorate the group's tenth anniversary since their debut in 2007. Lee Soo-man, founder of SM Entertainment, served as the album's executive producer.

The album is a primarily pop record containing ten tracks including the double singles "Holiday" and "All Night", which were released simultaneously with the digital release of the album. It peaked at number two on the Gaon Album Chart and has sold over 160,000 physical copies as of September 2017. The album also peaked atop the Billboard World Albums and the Taiwanese G-Music Chart and appeared on record charts of Australia, France, Japan, and New Zealand.

Background and composition
Holiday Night consists of ten tracks in various genres. The first single "All Night" was written by Kenzie, who penned Girls' Generation's debut single "Into the New World", while the second single "Holiday" was co-written by member Seohyun, who also wrote the track "Sweet Talk". Another track "It's You", a tribute to a fan-letter received by the group, was written by member Yuri.

Release and promotion
On July 4, 2017, Girls' Generation was announced to be releasing their sixth studio album in August 2017 to commemorate the group's tenth debut anniversary. On July 27, the album's title was revealed to be Holiday Night, ostensibly referring to its singles. The album and its singles' music videos were released online on August 4, while physical copies became available on August 7, 2017.

To celebrate their anniversary, Girls' Generation held a fanmeeting titled "Holiday to Remember" on August 5, 2017, at Olympic Hall, where they performed "Holiday", "All Night" and "One Last Time" for the first time. They performed the singles on South Korean music television shows on August 10, 12 and 13, 2017.

Commercial performance
Holiday Night sold over 90,000 copies within one week after being released, surpassing The Boys as Girls' Generation's fastest-selling Korean-language album. It debuted atop the Billboard World Album chart, and peaked at number 2 on the South Korean Gaon Album Chart.

It was the 18th best-selling album of 2017 with 167,638 physical copies.

Track listing
Credits adapted from Naver

Charts

Sales

Release history

References

2017 albums
Girls' Generation albums
SM Entertainment albums
Korean-language albums